Elachista nubila is a moth of the family Elachistidae that is endemic to  Arizona.

The forewings are broad, grey and densely dusted with light brown scales especially along the costa and in the distal half of the wing. The hindwings and underside of the wings are grey. Females are larger and have paler forewings, varying from dirty yellowish white to light greyish brown.

Etymology
The species name is derived from Latin nubilus (meaning gloomy).

References

Moths described in 1997
nubila
Endemic fauna of Arizona
Moths of North America